The Marquess of Beixiang (died 10 December 125), personal name Liu Yi, also referred to as Emperor Shao (少帝, literally "young emperor"), was an emperor of the Chinese Han Dynasty. He was selected to succeed Emperor An after Emperor An's sudden death in April 125, but died soon after he became emperor and a eunuch coup in favour of Emperor Shun overthrew the regime of Empress Dowager Yan, who put him on the throne.

No historical records indicate his age, but later references to him imply that he was young, perhaps a child.  As his reign was short and considered at least somewhat illegitimate, he is often omitted from the official list of emperors.

Family background 
It is not known when Liu Yi was born—other than he was described as young at the time he ascended the throne on 18 May 125 and therefore must have been born late in the reign of Emperor An. His father was Liu Shou (劉壽), Prince Hui of Jibei, who was the fifth son of Emperor Zhang, making him Emperor An's cousin. Nothing is known about his mother.  He was likely created a marquess in 120, when five brothers of his oldest brother, Liu Deng (劉登), Prince Jie of Jibei, were created marquesses.

Brief reign 
Empress Dowager Yan's decision was supported by other powerful people trusted by Emperor An—his stepuncle Geng Bao (耿寶), the eunuchs Jiang Jing (江京) and Fan Feng (樊豐), and his wet nurse Wang Sheng (王聖).  Soon, however, Empress Yan and her brother Yan Xian (閻顯) wanted to have full control of power, and they falsely accused Fan, Wang, and Geng of crimes.  Fan was executed, while Wang and Geng, along with their families, were exiled.  The Yan brothers became the most powerful officials in the capital Luoyang and ruled autocratically.

Late in the year, however, the young emperor grew gravely ill, and eunuchs loyal to Prince Bao, led by Sun Cheng (孫程), formed a conspiracy to overthrow the Yans.  As soon as the emperor died, the eunuchs overthrew the Yans in a coup d'état and made Prince Bao emperor (as Emperor Shun).  The Yans were slaughtered, except for Empress Dowager Yan, who was however rendered powerless.

Emperor Shun, recognizing that the former Marquess of Beixiang was young and not complicit in Empress Yan's plot, did not posthumously dishonor him or carry out reprisals against his family, but nor did he recognize his predecessor as a legitimate emperor.  Later in the year, he had the former emperor buried with the honors of an imperial prince—in other words, higher than of his previous title of marquess but lower than that of an emperor.  No official posthumous name was recorded for this young emperor.

Ancestry

See also
 Family tree of the Han Dynasty

References

 Book of Later Han, vol. 5.
 Zizhi Tongjian, vol. 51.

125 deaths
Eastern Han dynasty emperors
Monarchs who died as children
Child monarchs from Asia
2nd-century Chinese monarchs
Year of birth unknown